Arcadia (formerly Arcada) is a small Unincorporated community in Shelby County, Texas, United States. It sits at an elevation of 351 feet (107 m).

References

Unincorporated communities in Shelby County, Texas
Unincorporated communities in Texas